is a folk song of Akita prefecture, Japan. It is said that it was created when Kubota domain in Akita prefecture was inspected by Yoshitaka Satake in 1663. It was originally known simply as the "Ondo" ("Marching Song"), but it is said that around the beginning of the Meiji era it became known as the "Akita Ondo".

The unique characteristic of the Akita Ondo is its litany of humorous lyrics, accompanied by instruments like the shamisen, flute, and bell. Besides the initial cry "yātonā" (or "yātosei"), there is little few musical intervals are used. The verses are simply laid out upon a 7-7-9 rhythm, in style similar to modern rap music.

Lyrics

References

See also 
 Meibutsu

Japanese songs
Japanese-language songs
17th-century songs
Year of song unknown
Songwriter unknown